James M. Crawford (21 May 1904 – 24 May 1976) was a Scottish amateur footballer who played as an outside right for Queen's Park in the Scottish League in the 1920s and 1930s.

Representative career 
Crawford was one of the last amateur players to earn selection for Scotland and won five caps in the early 1930s, plus three selections for the Scottish League XI. As an amateur, he was also eligible for selection by Great Britain at the Olympic Games and he played in both of the team's matches in Berlin in 1936. Crawford also represented Scotland at amateur level.

Personal life 
Crawford attended Whitehill Secondary School. As well as a footballer he was also an accomplished sprinter, winning several Scottish titles and setting national records. Away from sport he worked as a clothing retailer and served in the Royal Air Force during World War II.

See also 
List of one-club men in association football

References

External links 

 

1904 births
1976 deaths
Footballers from Glasgow
Scottish footballers
Scotland international footballers
Scottish male sprinters
Queen's Park F.C. players
Scottish Football League players
Footballers at the 1936 Summer Olympics
Olympic footballers of Great Britain
Scottish Football League representative players
Scotland amateur international footballers
Royal Air Force personnel of World War II
Association football outside forwards
People educated at Whitehill Secondary School
People from Dennistoun